Kids Click (literally "The NET for Little People") is a kids' programme produced by TVB, which is an educational kids program similar to a Sesame Street (PBS). Rated Elementary School work.

The show began on 17 January 2000 and ended on 31 December 2004.

TVB original programming
2000s Hong Kong television series
2000 Hong Kong television series debuts
2004 Hong Kong television series endings
Hong Kong children's television series